Adriana Salazar Varón (born 27 December 1963) is a Colombian chess player. She received the FIDE title of Woman International Master (WIM) in 1990 and is a nine-time winner of the Colombian Women's Chess Championship (1981, 1983, 1985, 1986, 1988, 1992, 1993, 1994, 1996).

Biography
From the 1980s to the 1990s, Salazar was one of the leading Colombian female chess players. She nine times won Colombian Women's Chess Championship: in 1981, 1983, 1985, 1986, 1988, 1992, 1993, 1994 and 1996. In 1990, Salazar participated in Women's World Chess Championship Interzonal Tournament in Azov where ranked 17th place.

Salazar played for Colombia in the Women's Chess Olympiads:
 In 1982, at second board in the 10th Chess Olympiad (women) in Lucerne (+3, =4, -5),
 In 1984, at first board in the 26th Chess Olympiad (women) in Thessaloniki (+8, =0, -6),
 In 1986, at first board in the 27th Chess Olympiad (women) in Dubai (+8, =0, -6),
 In 1988, at first board in the 28th Chess Olympiad (women) in Thessaloniki (+5, =4, -5),
 In 1994, at first board in the 31st Chess Olympiad (women) in Moscow (+7, =4, -3),
 In 1996, at second board in the 32nd Chess Olympiad (women) in Yerevan (+3, =5, -4).

In 1990, she was awarded the FIDE Woman International Master (WIM) title.

References

External links
 
 
 

1963 births
Living people
Colombian female chess players
Chess Woman International Masters
Chess Olympiad competitors
20th-century Colombian women